Kim Yong-il (born 17 March 1947) is a North Korean politician. , he is the Deputy Foreign Minister of the Democratic People's Republic of Korea.

References

Living people
Government ministers of North Korea
1947 births
Place of birth missing (living people)